The 2014 African Women's Handball Championship was the 21st edition of the African Women's Handball Championship, held in Algiers and Chéraga, Algeria, from 16 to 25 January 2014. It acted as the African qualifying tournament for the 2015 World Women's Handball Championship in Denmark.

Venues

Qualification

1 Bold indicates champion for that year. Italics indicates host.

Draw
The draw was held on 9 October 2013.

Squads

Preliminary round
Times are local (UTC+1).

Group A

Group B

Knockout stage

Bracket

5–8th place bracket

Quarterfinals

5–8th place semifinals

Semifinals

Seventh place game

Fifth place

Third place game

Final

Final ranking

References

External links

African Handball Federation
Results at todor66

2014 Women
African Women's Handball Championship
African Women's Handball Championship
African Women's Handball Championship
Women's Championship
Women's Handball Championship
2014 in African women's sport